Jorge Martínez de Hoyos (September 25, 1920 – May 6, 1997) was a Mexican actor whose career spanned five decades from the 1940s till his death. He appeared in both American and Mexican films and television, with prominent roles in The Magnificent Seven and Viento negro (Black Wind). He died from lung cancer on May 6, 1997.

Selected filmography

 Corner Stop (1948) – Rabanito
 A Family Like Many Others (1949) – Anunciador en fiesta (uncredited)
 Hay lugar para dos (1949) – (uncredited)
 Confessions of a Taxi Driver (1949) – Luis 
 Cuatro contra el mundo (1950) – Don Nacho (uncredited)
 Pobre corazón (1950) – Invitado a fiesta (uncredited)
 Pata de palo (1950) – Ferrocarrilero (uncredited)
 Entre tu amor y el cielo (1950)
 El grito de la carne (1951) – Invitado a fiesta
 Vivillo desde chiquillo (1951) – Policía (uncredited)
 They Say I'm a Communist (1951) – Miembro del comité (uncredited)
 Mexican Bus Ride (1952) – Guia de turistas (uncredited)
 Montana Territory (1952) – Road Agent (uncredited)
 Now I Am Rich (1952) – Vendedor (uncredited)
 La mujer que tu quieres (1952)
 The Mystery of the Express Car (1953)
 Los dineros del diablo (1953) – Doctor (uncredited)
 Sueños de gloria (1953) – Jerónimo (uncredited)
 Sombra verde (1954) – Pedro González
 El Túnel 6 (1955) – José
 The Treasure of Pancho Villa (1955) – Revolutionary (uncredited)
 La doncella de piedra (1956) – Airapúa
 Comanche (1956) – (uncredited)
 Where the Circle Ends (1956) – Inspector Carlos Carrillo
 The Hidden One (1956) – Máximo Tepal
 Death in the Garden (1956) – Captain Ferrero 
 Los amantes (1956)
 Canasta de cuentos mexicanos (1956) – Hombre de las canastas (segment "Canasta")
 Dios no lo quiera (1957) – Chema
 La mafia del crimen (1958) 
 Una golfa (1958) – Toño
 Ama a tu prójimo (1958) – Entrenador
 La sonrisa de la Virgen (1958) – Anselmo
 Café Colón (1959) – Coronel Simón Sánchez
 Sábado negro (1959)
 Beyond All Limits (1959) – Rafael Ortega
 La reina del cielo (1959) – Gran cacique
 The Miracle Roses (1960) – Juan Diego
 The Magnificent Seven (1960) – Hilario
 Mañana serán hombres (1961) – don Efrén Maldonado
 Hidden Paradise (1962) – Don Lorenzo
 Las recién casadas (1962) – Juan
 Un día de diciembre (1962)
 Tlayucan (1962) – Padre Aurelio, señor cura
 ...Qué hacer con mis hijos... (1962)
 Los Chacales (1963)
 Cinco asesinos esperan (1964)
 100 Cries of Terror (1965) – Dr. Javier Medina (segment "Miedo supremo")
 Nido de águilas (1965) – El Tigre
 Black Wind (1965) – Ulalio
 Smoky (1966) – Pepe
 Tiempo de morir (1966) – Juan Sayago
 The Professionals (1966) – Padillia
 El secreto del texano (1966)
 Day of the Evil Gun (1968) – Guillermo – DeLeon's Second in Command (uncredited)
 Guns for San Sebastian (1968) – Felipe Cayetano
 Valentín de la Sierra (1968)
 Suave patria (1968)
 La manzana de la discordia (1968)
 La trinchera (1969)
 The Adventurers (1970) – El Condor
 The Bridge in the Jungle (1971) – Agustin
 Furias bajo el cielo (1971)
 The Garden of Aunt Isabel (1971) – Capitaine de Ballesteros
 Los días del amor (1972) – Vicente Icaza
 The Revengers (1972) – Cholo
 Those Years (1973) – Benito Juárez
 La venida del Rey Olmos (1975)
 El cumpleaños del perro (1975) – Jorge Maldonado
 La India (1976) – El Maestro
 Las Poquianchis (1976) – Don Rosario
 Lo mejor de Teresa (1976) – Tío Eleazar
 Los hermanos del viento (1977) – Federico
 The Divine Caste (1977) – General Salvador Alvarado
 Los amantes frios (1978) – Librado (segment "Los Amantes frios")
 Crónica íntima (1979)
 Una leyenda de amor (1982) – Padre Diego
 Aquel famoso Remington (1982)
 Pesadilla (1985) – Narrator
 La habitación que silva (1985) – Narrator
 La dama solitaria (1985) – Narrator
 Dulce espiritu (1985) – Narrator
 Damian (1985) – Narrator
 Astucia (1986) 
 Murieron a la mitad del rio (1986) – Don Chebo
 Días difíciles (1988) – Senador Domínguez
 Lonesome Dove (1989, TV Mini-Series) – Po Campo 
 Cronos (1993) – Narrator (voice)
 A Trickle of Blood (1995) – Don Manuel
 Oedipo alcalde (1996) – Cura

Television appearances
 El pecado de Oyuki (1988) – Sir Charles Pointer
 El abuelo y yo (1992) – Don Joaquín
 Pueblo chico, infierno grande (1997) – Chucho Ríos
 Alondra (1995) - Alfredito

See also
 TVyNovelas Award for Best Lead Actor

External links
 

1920 births
1997 deaths
20th-century Mexican male actors
Ariel Award winners
Best Actor Ariel Award winners
Deaths from lung cancer
Mexican male film actors
Mexican male telenovela actors
Mexican expatriates in the United States